The Tale of the Golden Cockerel is the last fairy tale in verse by Alexander Pushkin. Pushkin wrote the tale in 1834 and it was first published in literary magazine Biblioteka dlya chteniya (Library for Reading) in 1835. While not officially based on any specific fairy tale, a number of similar stories were later revealed by scholars, most famously by Anna Akhmatova in her 1933 essay Pushkin's Last Fairy Tale. Among the influences named were the Legend of the Arabian Astrologer from Tales of the Alhambra by Washington Irving, Der goldene Hahn (1785) by Friedrich Maximilian Klinger and Kaib (1792) by Ivan Krylov. In turn, all of them borrowed from the ancient Copts legend first translated by the French arabist Pierre Vattier in 1666 using the 1584 manuscript from the collection of Cardinal Mazarin.

Adaptations
1907 – The Golden Cockerel, opera by Nikolai Rimsky-Korsakov.
1967 – The Golden Cockerel, USSR, production of a film studio Soyuzmultfilm, popular animated film by Alexandra Snezhko-Blotskaya.

Literature
 Alexander Pushkin: A Critical Study by A.D.P. Briggs, Rowman & Littlefield Publishers, 1982.

References

External links

 «Сказка о золотом петушке» available at Russian Virtual Library
The Tale of the Golden Cockerel, translated by Walter W. Arndt



Poetry by Aleksandr Pushkin
Tale of Alexander Pushkin
1834 poems
Adaptations of works by Washington Irving